Tracy Brown (born 1974)  is an American author of urban fiction who is known for her works set in Staten Island, New York.

Personal life
Tracy Brown lives in Staten Island, New York, where she was born and grew up.

Brown became pregnant with her daughter when she was still a teenager. But, she managed to graduate high school despite the odds. She is also the mother of two sons. She is an alumnus of John Jay College of Criminal Justice.

She runs a nonprofit organization known as We Are Ladies First, LTD which seeks to inform, inspire, and empower the young women of Staten Island. She also mentors and teaches a course on writing to young ladies in a correctional environment of the New York State Foster Care System. She lends her talents to community plays, musicals, and church programs, writing and directing her first stage play "Brand New" in 2016.

Books
Her books, which are set in Staten Island and focus on women who triumph despite adversity, have been Essence Magazine, and USA Today bestsellers.

Bibliography
Black, Triple Crown Publications, 2003
Dime Piece, Triple Crown Publications, 2004
Criminal Minded, St. Martin's Griffin, 2005
White Lines, St. Martin's Griffin, 2007
Twisted, St. Martin's Griffin, 2008
Snapped, St. Martin's Griffin, 2009
Aftermath, St. Martin's Griffin, 2011
White Lines II: Sunny, St. Martin's Griffin, 2012
Flirting with Disaster, St. Martin's Griffin, 2013
White Lines III: All Falls Down, St. Martin's Griffin, 2015
Boss, St. Martin's Griffin, 2017
Single Black Female, St. Martin's Griffin, 2021
Hold You Down, St. Martin's Griffin, 2022

Tracy Brown's stories have appeared in the anthologies The Game: Short Stories About the Life and Flirt. She is also a celebrity ghostwriter and biographer.

References

External links
Tracy Brown, Macmillan Publishers

Living people
1974 births
Writers from Staten Island
21st-century American women writers
21st-century African-American women writers
21st-century African-American writers
20th-century African-American people
20th-century African-American women